This is a list of Iranian football transfers for the 2013–14 winter transfer window. Transfers of Iran Pro League is listed.

Rules and regulations 
The Iranian Football Clubs who participate in 2013–14 Iran Pro League are allowed to have up to maximum 38 players (including up to maximum 4 non-Iranian players) in their player lists, which will be categorized in the following groups:
 Up to maximum 21 adult (without any age limit) players
 Up to maximum 9 under-23 players (i.e. the player whose birth is after 21 March 1990).
 Up to maximum 5 under-21 players (i.e. the player whose birth is after 1 January 1993).
 Up to maximum 3 under-19 players (i.e. the player whose birth is after 1 January 1995).

According to Iran Football Federation rules for 2013-14 Football Season, each Football Club is allowed to take up to maximum 6 new  players . In addition to these six new players, each club is allowed to take up to maximum 4 non-Iranian new players (at least one of them should be Asian) and up to 3 players from Free agent (who did not play in 2012–13 Iran Pro League season or doesn't list in any 2013–14 League after season's start).

Iran Pro League

Damash 

In:

Out:

Esteghlal 

In:

Out:

Esteghlal Khuzestan 

In:

Out:

Fajr Sepasi 

In:

Out:

Foolad 

In:

 
 

 

Out:

Gostaresh Foolad 

In:

Out:

Malavan 

In:

Out:

Mes Kerman 

In:

Out:

Naft Tehran 

In:

Out:

Persepolis 

In:

Out:

Rah Ahan Sorinet 

In:

 

Out:

Saba Qom 

In:

Out:

Saipa 

In:
 

Out:

Sepahan 

In:

Out:

Tractor Sazi 

In:

 

Out:

Zob Ahan 

In:

 

Out:

Notes and references

Football transfers winter 2013–14
2013
Transfers